William Ronald Durnan (January 22, 1916 – October 31, 1972) was a Canadian professional ice hockey goaltender who played seven seasons with the Montreal Canadiens in the National Hockey League (NHL) between 1943 and 1950. During his career he was one of the most dominant goaltenders in the NHL, winning the Vezina Trophy for fewest goals allowed six times, being named First All-Star team as best goaltender six times, and helped the Canadiens win the Stanley Cup two times. Dealing with a nervous condition throughout his career, Durnan retired in 1950, citing the stress of playing professional hockey. Durnan also served as the captain of the Canadiens in 1948, the last goaltender to be allowed to captain his team. In 1964 Durnan was inducted into the Hockey Hall of Fame, and in 2017 he was named one of the '100 Greatest NHL Players' in history.

Playing career
Durnan played only seven seasons in the National Hockey League due to being 27 upon entering the league, but accomplished much in his short career. He was the recipient of the Vezina Trophy for allowing the fewest goals against in each of his first four seasons, from 1943–44 to 1946–47, becoming the first to capture the award in four consecutive seasons. A poor season by the Montreal Canadiens in 1947–48 allowed Turk Broda of the Toronto Maple Leafs to end Durnan's streak. Durnan, however, returned to prominence the next two seasons, capturing his fifth and sixth Vezina Trophies in 1948–49 and 1949–50. Durnan was also selected to the First Team All-Star six times during his career, including four consecutive selections from 1944 to 1947.

During the 1947–48 season, Durnan served as the Canadiens' captain. However, he left the crease so often to argue calls that other teams claimed he was giving the Canadiens unscheduled timeouts. After the season, the NHL passed a rule barring goaltenders from performing the duties of captain, known as the "Durnan Rule." While Roberto Luongo was named "captain" of the Vancouver Canucks in 2008, Luongo had no on-ice rights as such, making Durnan the last goalie to officially serve as captain, and to wear the C on his jersey in the National Hockey League.

Following the 1949–50 NHL season, at the age of 35, Durnan retired, no longer able to stand the stress of playing professional hockey. He later went into coaching, most notably with the Ottawa Senators of the QSHL in 1950–51, and the Kitchener-Waterloo Dutchmen of the OHA in 1958–59.

Durnan set a long-standing modern NHL record between February 26 and March 6, 1949, when he registered four consecutive shutouts, not allowing a goal over a span of 309 minutes, 21 seconds. This record stood until 2004, when Brian Boucher, then of the Phoenix Coyotes, broke it with five straight shutouts in 332:01 minutes. He was ranked 5th all-time in career wins, shutouts and GAA.

Durnan was inducted into the Hockey Hall of Fame in 1964. In 383 regular-season games, Durnan had 208 wins, and 112 losses, with 34 shutouts and a 2.36 goals-against average. He had 27 wins, and 12 losses, with two shutouts and a 2.07 average in 45 playoff games. Durnan also won the 1940 Allan Cup with the Kirkland Lake Blue Devils.

Playing style
Durnan was an ambidextrous goalie, equally adept at using his right or left hand (he wore special gloves that permitted him to catch with either hand while still holding his stick), and was a very good stand-up goaltender due to his relatively taller stature for his time.

Personal life
Durnan was born and raised in Toronto. He was married to Mandy Durnan (born 1915).

Durnan died of kidney failure on October 31, 1972. He suffered from diabetes in his last years and his health had been failing steadily.

The Aréna Bill-Durnan, a community ice rink, is located in the Côte-des-Neiges–Notre-Dame-de-Grâce borough of Montreal.

Awards
Allan Cup champion in 1940.
NHL first All-Star team goalie in 1944, 1945, 1946, 1947, 1949, 1950.
Won the Vezina Trophy in 1944, 1945, 1946, 1947, 1949, 1950.
Played in NHL All-Star Game in 1947, 1948, 1949.
Stanley Cup champion in 1944, 1946.
Inducted into the Hockey Hall of Fame in 1964.
In 1998, he was ranked number 34 on The Hockey News' list of the 100 Greatest Hockey Players.
 In January, 2017, Durnan was named one of the '100 Greatest NHL Players' in history.

Career statistics

Regular season and playoffs

See also
List of members of the Hockey Hall of Fame

References

External links
 

1916 births
1972 deaths
Canadian ice hockey coaches
Canadian ice hockey goaltenders
Deaths from kidney failure
Hockey Hall of Fame inductees
Montreal Canadiens players
Montreal Royals (QSHL) players
National Hockey League goaltender captains
Ice hockey people from Toronto
Stanley Cup champions
Vezina Trophy winners